Those Who Walk Away is an American horror film directed and written by Robert Rippberger. Like 1917 (film) and Rope (film) the film is shot in one continuous take. It was released theatrically in the U.S. and distributed internationally by VMI Releasing. The film stars Booboo Stewart, known for his role in the Descendents trilogy, the Twilight franchise, and X-Men. Co-stars are Scarlett Sperduto, Grant Morningstar, Bryson JonSteele, and Nils Allen Stewart whom plays the monster, "Rotcreep."

Reception

Critical Response
The film was a top pick by The New York Times in March 2022.

KTLA Morning News interviewed Robert Rippberger and Booboo Stewart about the theatrical release.

References

External links 
 
 

2022 films
2022 horror films
American horror films
American horror thriller films
Films shot in Illinois
Films set in Illinois
2020s English-language films
2020s American films